Asif Imrose is a Bangladeshi actor and model.

Acting career 
Imrose came in to the media participating in the reality show Super Hero Super Heroine. The reality show was held in 2009, jointly organized by Bangladesh Film Development Corporation and satellite television channel NTV. In that competition, he achieved the distinction of being the 1st Runner up. In 2014, Asif made his acting debut in the film Dobir Saheber Songsar, with co-star Mahiya Mahi.

Filmography

References

External links 
 

Living people
Bangladeshi male film actors
Bangladeshi male models
Year of birth missing (living people)
Place of birth missing (living people)